Hypnophila is a genus of small air-breathing land snails, terrestrial pulmonate gastropod mollusks in the family Azecidae.

Species 
Species in the genus Hypnophila include:
 Hypnophila cyclothyra (O. Boettger, 1885)
 † Hypnophila loxostoma (Klein, 1853) 
 Hypnophila malagana E. Gittenberger & Menkhorst, 1983
 Hypnophila polita (Porro, 1838)
 Hypnophila psathyrolena (Bourguignat, 1859)
 Hypnophila pupaeformis (Cantraine, 1835)
 † Hypnophila subrimata (Reuss in Reuss & Meyer, 1849) 
 Hypnophila zacynthia (J. R. Roth, 1855)
Species brought into synonymy* Hypnophila bisacchii Giusti, 1970: synonym of Gomphroa bisacchii (Giusti, 1970)
 Hypnophila boissii (Dupuy, 1851): synonym of Gomphroa boissii (Dupuy, 1851) (superseded combination)
 Hypnophila boissyi (Dupuy, 1851): synonym of Hypnophila boissii (Dupuy, 1851): synonym of Gomphroa boissii (Dupuy, 1851)
 Hypnophila cylindracea (Calcara, 1840): synonym of Gomphroa cylindracea (Calcara, 1840) (superseded combination)
 Hypnophila dohrni (Paulucci, 1882): synonym of Gomphroa dohrni (Paulucci, 1882)
 Hypnophila emiliana (Bourguignat, 1859): synonym of Gomphroa emiliana (Bourguignat, 1859) (superseded combination)
 Hypnophila etrusca (Paulucci, 1886): synonym of Gomphroa etrusca (Paulucci, 1886)
 Hypnophila girottii Esu, 1978: synonym of Gomeziella girottii (Esu, 1978) (new combination)
 Hypnophila incerta (Bourguignat, 1859): synonym of Gomphroa incerta (Bourguignat, 1859) (superseded combination)
 Hypnophila remyi (Boettger, 1949): synonym of Gomphroa remyi (O. Boettger, 1949)
 Hypnophila zirjensis Štamol, Manganelli, Barbato & Giusti, 2018: synonym of Gomphroa zirjensis (Štamol, Manganelli, Barbato & Giusti, 2018) (superseded combination)

References

External links 
 Animal Base info
 Bourguignat, J.-R. (1859). Aménités Malacologiques. § LXVIII. Notice monographique sur le genre Azeca. Revue et Magasin de Zoologie Pure et Appliquée. (2) 10 (12) [“1858”: 527-545, pl. 18; (2) 11 (1): 16-21. Paris (≥ January; > January). [= Aménités Malacologiques, Tome second (livr. 5): 85-109, pl. 14 (1859). Paris (J.-B. BAILLIÈRE) ]

Azecidae